Du Quoin station is an Amtrak intercity train station in Du Quoin, Illinois, United States, on the  routes. The City of New Orleans route also passes by this station, but does not stop here. It was built in 1989 by the city of Du Quoin, with assistance from the Illinois Department of Transportation.

The former Du Quoin station for the Illinois Central Railroad, built in 1901, burned on June 29, 1971 after being slated for demolition.

References

External links 

Du Quion Amtrak Station (USA Rail Guide -- Train Web)

Amtrak stations in Illinois
Buildings and structures in Perry County, Illinois
Railway stations in the United States opened in 1989